is a professional Japanese baseball player. He plays catcher for the Tokyo Yakult Swallows.

External links

 NPB.com

1992 births
Living people
Baseball people from Kyoto Prefecture
Japanese baseball players
Nippon Professional Baseball catchers
Tokyo Yakult Swallows players